B1 Preliminary, previously known as Cambridge English: Preliminary and the Preliminary English Test (PET), is an English language examination provided by Cambridge Assessment English (previously known as Cambridge English Language Assessment and University of Cambridge ESOL examinations).

B1 Preliminary is an intermediate-level qualification and is designed for learners who have mastered the basic of English and now have practical language skills for everyday use. It is targeted at Level B1 of the Common European Framework of Reference (CEFR).

B1 Preliminary is one of the examinations in Cambridge English Qualifications – a path for improving language skills. Each Cambridge English Qualification targets a particular level of the CEFR and they work together to create an effective learning journey.

There are Cambridge English Qualifications for schools, general and higher education, and business. B1 Preliminary is offered in two versions, B1 Preliminary for Schools, for school-aged learners, and B1 Preliminary, for general and higher education adult learners.

History

B1 Preliminary was first launched in 1943. It had been created as a special exam to meet the contingencies of the Second World War – catering for the large numbers of foreign servicemen needing English. However, despite recording over a thousand candidates during its first year alone, the exam was discontinued at the end of World War II (1946).

It was not until the late 1970s  that this decision was reconsidered. B1 Preliminary was reintroduced in 1980 under close monitoring, and was fully launched in the 1990s.  It received updates in 1994. In 1999, it was reviewed with stakeholders and the current version was launched in March 2004.

B1 Preliminary and B1 Preliminary for Schools
B1 Preliminary is available in two versions:
 B1 Preliminary, designed for adult learners. B1 Preliminary is one of the exams that make up Cambridge English Qualifications for general and higher education.
 B1 Preliminary for Schools, designed for school-aged learners. B1 Preliminary for Schools is one of the exams that make up Cambridge English Qualifications for schools.

B1 Preliminary and B1 Preliminary for Schools both have the same exam format (e.g. number of papers, number of questions, time allowance), both support learners to develop real-life communication skills, and both versions lead to the same certificate.

The exams use different topics and content:
 B1 Preliminary is targeted at the interests and experiences of adult learners and is designed to support learners whatever their goals – whether they want to get into university, start their own business or develop their career.
 B1 Preliminary for Schools is designed specifically for school-aged students and is informed by research into how children develop language skills. The topics and tasks in the exam are designed to reinforce the learning students do in class.

Format

Both versions of the exam (B1 Preliminary and B1 Preliminary for Schools) are made up of three exam papers, which cover all four language skills (Reading, Writing, Listening and Speaking).

The Speaking paper is taken face-to-face and candidates have the choice of taking the Reading and Writing paper and Listening paper on either a computer or on paper.

1. Reading and Writing (1 hour 30 minutes – 50% of total marks)

The Reading and Writing paper has eight parts and 42 questions. Candidates are expected to read and understand different kinds of short texts and longer, factual texts. Text sources might include signs, brochures, newspapers, magazines and messages such as notes, emails, cards and postcards.

Parts 1 to 5 focus on reading skills, including underlying knowledge of vocabulary and grammar. The exam includes tasks such as answering multiple choice questions, selecting descriptions which match different texts, and identifying true or false information.

Parts 6 to 8 focus on writing skills, including underlying knowledge of vocabulary and grammar. The exam includes tasks such as completing gapped sentences, writing a short informal letter of 35 – 45 words based on 3 given instructions, and producing a longer piece of writing – either a long informal letter or a story of about 80-100 words.

2. Listening (approximately 35 minutes – 25% of total marks)

The Listening paper has four parts comprising 25 questions. Candidates are expected to understand a range of spoken materials, in both informal and neutral settings, on a range of everyday topics. Recorded materials may include announcements, interviews and discussions about everyday life.

Part 1 has seven short recordings and three pictures for each. Candidates listen for key pieces of information in order to complete seven multiple choice questions.

Part 2 has a longer recording either in monologue or interview format. Candidates identify simple factual information in the recording to answer six multiple choice questions.

Part 3 has a longer monologue, which may be a radio announcement or a recorded message with information about places and events. Candidates are given a page of notes summarising the recording and must fill in six pieces of information which are missing from the notes.

Part 4 has an informal conversation between two people who are discussing everyday topics. Candidates decide whether six statements are true or false, based on the information, attitudes and opinions of the people in the recording.

3. Speaking (10–12 minutes – 25% of total marks)

The Speaking paper has four parts and is conducted face-to-face, with one or two other candidates and two examiners. Candidates are expected to demonstrate conversation skills by answering and asking questions and talking freely about their likes and dislikes.

Part 1 is a general conversation with the examiner. Candidates give personal information about themselves, e.g. talk about their daily life, studies, plans for the future, etc.

Part 2 is a collaborative task with the other candidate(s). The examiner gives the candidates some pictures and describes a situation. The candidates discuss the issues and decide what would be best in the situation.

Part 3 is completed individually. Each candidate has one minute to describe a photograph provided by the examiner.

Part 4 is a discussion with the other candidate(s). The candidates discuss the topic related to the photographs they were given in Part 3 of the exam, talking about their opinions.

Scoring
In February 2016, Cambridge English Scale scores replaced the candidate profile and standardised scores used for pre-2016 results. All candidates (pre- and post-2016) receive a Statement of Results, with those scoring high enough also receiving a certificate.

Scoring from February 2016

From 2016, the Statement of Results and the Certificate have the following information about the candidate’s performance:
 A score on the Cambridge English Scale for each skill (Reading, Writing, Listening and Speaking) 
 A score on the Cambridge English Scale for the overall exam
 A grade (Pass with Distinction, Pass with Merit and Pass) for the overall exam
 A CEFR level for the overall exam.

The candidate’s overall score is averaged from the individual scores for each paper (Reading, Writing, Listening and Speaking).

B1 Preliminary is targeted at CEFR Level B1, but also provides reliable assessment at the level above B1 (Level B2) and the level below (Level A2). The following scores are used to report results:

The following scores are used to report results:

Scores between 102 and 119 are also reported on the Statement of Results but candidates will not receive the Preliminary English Test certificate.

Scoring pre-February 2016

Pre-2016, the Statement of Results had the following information, reflecting the total combined score from all three papers:
 A grade (Pass with Distinction, Pass with Merit and Pass) for the overall exam
 A score (out of 100) for the overall exam
 A CEFR level for the overall exam.

Pre-2016, the Statement of Results had a Candidate Profile, which showed the candidate’s performance on each of the individual papers against the following scale: exceptional, good, borderline and weak.

Pre-2016, candidates who achieved a score of 45 or more (out of 100) received a certificate.

Timing and results

Candidates take the Reading and Writing and the Listening papers on the same day. The Speaking paper is often taken a few days before or after the exam, or on the same day.

The paper-based exam and computer-based exam are offered at test centres throughout the calendar year. A directory of all global exam centres and their contact details can be accessed on the Cambridge Assessment English

Successful candidates receive two documents: a Statement of Results and a certificate. Employers and other organisations may require either of these documents as proof of English language skills.

An online Statement of Results is available to candidates four to six weeks after the paper-based exam and two weeks after the computer-based exam. Successful candidates (those scoring above 45) receive a hard copy certificate which is despatched to the exam centre within eight weeks of the paper-based exam and within three weeks of the computer-based exam.

Usage
B1 Preliminary demonstrates language proficiency at Level B1 of the Common European Framework of Reference (CEFR).

It is an intermediate level qualification and is designed to show that a successful candidate has the ability to use English language skills to deal with everyday written and spoken communications, e.g. read simple books / textbooks and articles, write simple letters on familiar subjects, make notes during meetings / lessons.

Learners can use this qualification for education or work purposes, as well as to progress to higher level English language qualifications such as B2 First, C1 Advanced and C2 Proficiency.

Many higher education institutions around the world accept and use B1 Preliminary as an indication of English language proficiency. This includes universities based in:
 Brazil (e.g. Centro Universitário Newton Paiva)
 Chile (e.g. Universidad de Chile)
 Germany (e.g. Freie Universität Berlin)
 Italy (e.g. La Salle Centro Universitario) 
 Mexico (e.g. Tec de Monterrey)
 Peru (e.g. Pontificia Universidad Católica del Perú)
 Vietnam (e.g. Hue University)
 Spain (e.g. La Salle Centro Universitario)
 UK (e.g. INTO Partnership Universities such as the University of Exeter).

A full list of organisations can be accessed on the Cambridge Assessment English website.

Many global companies and brands accept B1 Preliminary as part of their recruitment processes, including Metrostay in the Czech Republic, Chelsea Football Club Academy in the UK and MNG Airlines in Turkey.

Preparation
A comprehensive list of authorised exam centres can be found on the Cambridge Assessment English website. Free preparation materials, such as sample tests, are available from the website for B1 Preliminary  and B1 Preliminary for Schools . There is also a wide range of official support materials, jointly developed by Cambridge Assessment English and Cambridge University Press.

See also
 Cambridge Assessment English
 Cambridge English Qualifications
 A2 Key
 B2 First
 C1 Advanced
 C2 Proficiency

References

External links
 Website for B1 Preliminary
 Website for B1 Preliminary for Schools

Standardized tests for English language
English-language education
English language tests
University of Cambridge examinations

de:Cambridge ESOL#Allgemeines Englisch